Jivan may refer to:

 Jivan Avetisyan, Armenian film director
 Bhai Jivan Singh
 Alin Jivan, Romanian artist gymnast
 Kantilal Jivan
 Bhanwarlal Jivan, Indian politician
 Jag Jivan Ram, Indian politician
 Jivan Gasparyan, Armenian musician and composer

See also 
 Jivani
 Jiwan